Nebo Center is a neighborhood and former census-designated place (CDP) in Barstow, San Bernardino County, California, United States. The population was 1,174 at the 2000 census. The City of Barstow annexed Nebo Center in 2001. The United States Marine Corps Logistics Base Barstow is located at Nebo Center.

Geography

Demographics
As of the census of 2000, there were 1,174 people, 349 households, and 325 families residing in the CDP. The population density was 460.5 inhabitants per square mile (177.8/km2). The racial makeup of the CDP was 60.6% White, 16.3% African American, 1.3% Native American, 3.2% Asian, 1.2% Pacific Islander, 13.0% from other races, and 4.5% from two or more races. Hispanic or Latino of any race were 21.1% of the population.

There were 349 households, out of which 61.6% had children under the age of 18 living with them, 88.0% were married couples living together, 3.7% had a female householder with no husband present, and 6.6% were non-families. 6.3% of all households were made up of individuals, and none had someone living alone who was 65 years of age or older.  The average household size was 3.11 and the average family size was 3.22.

In the CDP, the population was spread out, with 34.2% under the age of 18, 25.4% from 18 to 24, 37.2% from 25 to 44, 3.0% from 45 to 64, and 0.2% who were 65 years of age or older.  The median age was 23 years. For every 100 females, there were 121.1 males.  For every 100 females age 18 and over, there were 131.8 males.

The median income for a household in the CDP was $39,028, and the median income for a family was $34,531. Males had a median income of $23,586 versus $25,903 for females. The per capita income for the CDP was $13,671.  About 3.5% of families and 3.2% of the population were below the poverty line, including 3.0% of those under age 18 and none of those age 65 or over.

Politics

References

Former census-designated places in California
Neighborhoods in San Bernardino County, California